Daniele Celiento (born 6 August 1994) is an Italian footballer who plays as a defender for  club Cesena on loan from Bari.

Club career
He joined the ranks of Napoli. On 1 August 2013, he was loaned to Viareggio of the Lega Pro Prima Divisione (third level of football in Italy), where he totaled 22 appearances. On 25 July 2014, Napoli loaned him to Pistoiese. On 1 August 2015, he was loaned to Robur Siena.

On 7 July 2018, Serie B club Pescara announced the acquisition of Celiento.

However, just 3 weeks later, before he appeared in any official games for Pescara, he was transferred again, this time to Catanzaro in Serie C, signing a two-year contract on 26 July 2018.

On 15 September 2020 he moved to Bari. On 1 September 2022, Celiento was loaned to Cesena.

International career
In June 2015, Celiento played five friendly matches for Italy U-19.

Honours
Bari
 Serie C: 2021–22 (Group C)

References

External links

1994 births
Living people
Footballers from Naples
Italian footballers
Association football defenders
Serie C players
S.S.C. Napoli players
F.C. Esperia Viareggio players
U.S. Pistoiese 1921 players
A.C.N. Siena 1904 players
U.S. Viterbese 1908 players
Delfino Pescara 1936 players
U.S. Catanzaro 1929 players
S.S.C. Bari players
Cesena F.C. players
Italy youth international footballers